Lithachne is a genus of Neotropical plants in the grass family.

Species
 Lithachne horizontalis Chase - Minas Gerais, Rio de Janeiro, São Paulo, Mato Grosso
 Lithachne humilis Soderstr. - Honduras
 Lithachne pauciflora (Sw.) P.Beauv. - widespread from 	Jalisco to Paraguay
 Lithachne pinetii (C.Wright) Chase - Cuba

References

Bambusoideae
Bambusoideae genera
Grasses of North America
Grasses of South America
Grasses of Mexico
Flora of Central America
Flora of the Caribbean
Taxa named by Palisot de Beauvois